Prigorodny District is an administrative district (raion), one of the thirty in Sverdlovsk Oblast, Russia. As a municipal division, it is incorporated as Gornouralsky Urban Okrug. Its administrative center is the city of Nizhny Tagil (which is not administratively a part of the district). Population: 38,527 (2010 Census);

Administrative and municipal status
Within the framework of administrative divisions, Prigorodny District is one of the thirty in the oblast. The city of Nizhny Tagil serves as its administrative center, despite being incorporated separately as an administrative unit with the status equal to that of the districts.

As a municipal division, the district is incorporated as Gornouralsky Urban Okrug. The City of Nizhny Tagil is incorporated separately from the district as Nizhny Tagil Urban Okrug.

References

Notes

Sources

Districts of Sverdlovsk Oblast
